WKYB (107.5 FM) is a radio station licensed to serve the community of Perryville, Kentucky. The station is owned by Lincoln-Garrard Broadcasting Co., Inc., and airs a country music format.

The station was assigned the WKYB call letters by the Federal Communications Commission on December 14, 2015.

References

External links
 Official Website
 FCC Public Inspection File for WKYB
 

KYB
Radio stations established in 2016
2016 establishments in Kentucky
Country radio stations in the United States
Boyle County, Kentucky